, known as  from 2009 to 2017, is a Japanese animation studio formed in 1990.

History
Yumeta Company absorbed Hal Film Maker and changed its name to TYO Animations on July 1, 2009.

On December 1, 2017, Memory Tech Holdings announced that they had acquired TYO Animations, and made it a subsidiary of Graphinica. They also announced that the company's name would revert to Yumeta Company.

Works

Television series

OVAs/ONAs

Films

References

External links
 

 
Animation studios in Tokyo
Japanese companies established in 1990
Japanese animation studios
Mass media companies established in 1990